Zimbabwe (abbreviated ZIM) was represented at the 2002 Commonwealth Games, but did not take part in 2006 after withdrawing from the Commonwealth.

The country had taken part in the Commonwealth Games from the second games in 1934: first as Southern Rhodesia, then as Rhodesia and Nyasaland, then as Zimbabwe.

Medals

 
The medals were awarded in Swimming and Lawn Bowls (Blind), see 2002 Commonwealth Games results.

See also
Zimbabwe at the Commonwealth Games

External links
Zimbabwe at the 2002 Commonwealth Games 

Nations at the 2002 Commonwealth Games
2002
2002 in Zimbabwean sport